Saad Natiq Naji (born 19 March 1994), sometimes referred as Suad Natiq Naji, is an Iraqi footballer who plays for Abha Club in the Saudi Professional League and the Iraq national football team as a defender and defensive midfielder.

Club career
Born in Najaf Saad went through the Al-Najaf FC youth system and made his senior debut with his home club under Hatif Shamran in 2009 and was part of the club's first team for two seasons. However it was in the Iraqi capital that Saad made his name, when he joined Doura-based oil refinery club Al-Masafi in the south of Baghdad where he played for three seasons – earning his selection to the Iraqi U-19s. It was under Hakim Shaker that Saad Natiq became one of the nation's recognised defenders, playing for the Iraqi Under 19s at the FIFA World U-20 Cup in Turkey. It was his spell at Al-Masafi under the command of trainers Hassan Ahmed and Nadhim Shaker that he developed as a player and was transformed into a strong tackling centre half after used in several positions at the club including at right back having first started out as a midfield anchor in his early days at Al-Najaf. In the summer of 2014, the defender was signed by his former Al-Masafi club coach Nadhim Shaker to play for Al-Quwa Al-Jawiya after his club were relegated to the first division.

Al Arabi
Saad Natiq signed for Al Arabi for the 2017/18 season. He made his debut on September 17 against Al Sailiya which ended in a 3–1 defeat. He scored his first goal in the Qatar Stars League against Al Rayyan on November 19, with his second coming in the same match.

International career
On 26 August 2015, Natiq made his first international appearance for Iraq against Lebanon in a friendly match.

Honours

Club 
Al-Quwa Al-Jawiya
 Iraqi Premier League: 2016–17
 Iraq FA Cup: 2015–16
 AFC Cup: 2016, 2018
Al-Shorta
 Iraqi Premier League: 2021–22
 Iraqi Super Cup: 2019

International
Iraq U-20
 FIFA U-20 World Cup 4th-place (1): 2013
Iraq U-23
 Asian Games bronze-medal (1): 2014

References

External links
 
 

1994 births
Living people
People from Najaf
Association football defenders
Iraqi footballers
Iraq international footballers
Al-Quwa Al-Jawiya players
Al-Arabi SC (Qatar) players
Al-Shorta SC players
Al Batin FC players
Abha Club players
Qatar Stars League players
Saudi Professional League players
Expatriate footballers in Qatar
Iraqi expatriates in Qatar
Expatriate footballers in Saudi Arabia
Iraqi expatriate sportspeople in Saudi Arabia
Asian Games medalists in football
Footballers at the 2014 Asian Games
Footballers at the 2016 Summer Olympics
Olympic footballers of Iraq
2019 AFC Asian Cup players
Asian Games bronze medalists for Iraq
Medalists at the 2014 Asian Games
AFC Cup winning players